Elm Farm may refer to:

 Elm Farm, Aylesbury, a housing estate in Buckinghamshire, England
 Elm Farm Ollie, the first cow to fly in an airplane
 Elm Farm (Danville, New Hampshire)